Callix Sadeaq Crabbe (born February 14, 1983) is a Virgin Islands American former professional baseball second baseman and current coach in the Pittsburgh Pirates organization. He played in Major League Baseball (MLB) for the San Diego Padres. He was the assistant hitting coach at the MLB Level for the Texas Rangers from 2019 through 2021.

Playing career
Crabbe was drafted out of Stone Mountain High School in Stone Mountain, Georgia, by the Atlanta Braves in the 32nd round of the 2000 Major League Baseball draft but did not sign. He attended Young Harris College for one season, before transferring to State College of Florida, Manatee-Sarasota. He was drafted by the Milwaukee Brewers in the 12th round of the 2002 MLB draft and signed with the Brewers.

Minor leagues
Crabbe began the 2002 season at the Milwaukee Brewers' rookie league affiliate, the Ogden Raptors. He advanced in 2003 to Class A Beloit Snappers, in 2004 to Class A-Advanced High Desert Mavericks, and in 2005 to Double-A Huntsville Stars, where he also played in 2006. In 2007, he was promoted to the Brewers' Triple-A affiliate, the Nashville Sounds. With Nashville, he led the team in games played (130), at-bats (457), hits (131), runs scored (84), triples (9), stolen bases (17), and walks (67). Following the season he was selected as the 17th pick (Major League Phase) in the Rule 5 Draft by the San Diego Padres.

Upon returning to Milwaukee's organization, Crabbe was assigned to Triple-A Nashville. He became a free agent after the 2008 season and signed a minor league contract with the Seattle Mariners. He last played for the New Hampshire Fisher Cats, the Double-A affiliate of the Toronto Blue Jays, in 2011.

Major leagues
Crabbe played 21 games for the San Diego Padres in 2008. In 34 at-bats, he scored four runs on six hits and had two RBI. He had six strikeouts, walked four times, and compiled a .176 batting average. San Diego designated him for assignment on May 12, and was returned to the Brewers organization on May 16.

Due to a printing error Carlos Guevara appeared on one of his baseball cards.

Coaching career
After his playing career ended, Crabbe went in to coaching. His roles included, head varsity baseball coach for IMG Academy from 2012 to 2015 and baseball instructor at the IMG Academy from 2012 to 2015. Crabbe also ran his own baseball instructional program called Crabbe-ology Sports Development starting in November of 2015.  Crabbe-ology consulted with many major league hitters over the years in operation.  Crabbe also worked for The positive coaching alliance a non-profit organization focused on educating administrators, coaches, parents and players on the core principles needed for a great sporting environment with a focus on growth and development across the eco-system.   

On December 4, 2018, Crabbe was hired as the assistant hitting coach of the Texas Rangers. He served in that role for the 2019, 2020, and 2021 seasons. 

Crabbe was named the manager of the Greensboro Grasshoppers and assistant hitting coordinator for the Pittsburgh Pirates prior to the 2022 season. He will manage the Altoona Curve in 2023.

Awards 
In 2004, while playing for the High Desert Mavericks, he was named the best defensive second baseman in the California League.

In 2007, while playing for the Nashville Sounds, he was named the Applebee's "Home Team Hero of the Year." The award recognizes players for their participation in community outreach during the season.

Personal
He resides in Tampa, Florida, with his wife, Amanda, and two children, Calyx and Alana.

References

External links

Texas Rangers coaching bio

1983 births
Living people
Azucareros del Este players
American expatriate baseball players in the Dominican Republic
Beloit Snappers players
Huntsville Stars players
Las Vegas 51s players
Major League Baseball coaches
Major League Baseball players from the United States Virgin Islands
Major League Baseball second basemen
Minor league baseball managers
Nashville Sounds players
New Hampshire Fisher Cats players
Ogden Raptors players
People from Saint Thomas, U.S. Virgin Islands
San Diego Padres players
SCF Manatees baseball players
State College of Florida, Manatee–Sarasota alumni
Tacoma Rainiers players
Texas Rangers coaches
West Tennessee Diamond Jaxx players
Young Harris Mountain Lions baseball players
United States Virgin Islands expatriate baseball players